Bodieve is a small village in north Cornwall, England, in the United Kingdom. It is about 1 mile north of Wadebridge (where the 2011 Census population is included) on the B3314 Wadebridge-St Minver road.

References

External links

Villages in Cornwall
Wadebridge